Kane Stuart Williamson (born 8 August 1990) is a New Zealand cricketer who is currently the captain of the New Zealand national team in limited overs cricket. On 27 February 2023, Williamson became the all-time leading runscorer for New Zealand in test cricket.  He is a right-handed batsman and an occasional off spin bowler. 

Williamson made his first-class cricket debut in December 2007. He made his U-19 debut against the touring Indian U-19 team the same year and was named captain of the New Zealand U-19 team for the 2008 U-19 Cricket World Cup. He made his international debut in 2010. Williamson has represented New Zealand at the 2011, 2015 and 2019 editions of the Cricket World Cup and 2012, 2014, 2016 and 2021 editions of the ICC World Twenty20. He made his full-time captaincy debut for New Zealand in the 2016 ICC World Twenty20 in India. He captained New Zealand at the 2019 Cricket World Cup, leading the team to the final and winning the Player of the Tournament award in the process. On 31 December 2020, he reached a Test batting rating of 890, surpassing Steve Smith and Virat Kohli as the number one ranked Test batsmen in the world. He was nominated for the Sir Garfield Sobers Award for ICC Male Cricketer of the Decade, and the award for Test cricketer of the decade. Ian Chappell and Martin Crowe have ranked Williamson among the top four or five Test cricket batsmen, along with Joe Root, Steve Smith, and Virat Kohli of the current era.

Williamson was the only New Zealander to be named in the ICC Test Team of the Decade (2011–2020). The late former New Zealand cricketer, Martin Crowe, noted that, "we're seeing the dawn of probably our greatest ever batsman" in Williamson. In June 2021, he captained New Zealand to the inaugural ICC World Test Championship. In November 2021, he led New Zealand to the final of the ICC T20 World Cup.

Early life
Williamson was born on 8 August 1990 in Tauranga, New Zealand. His father Brett was a sales representative who had played under-17 and club cricket in New Zealand and his mother Sandra had been a representative basketball player. He has a twin brother Logan, who is one minute younger than him. The brothers have three older sisters, Anna, Kylie and Sophie. All three were accomplished volleyball players, and Anna and Sophie were in New Zealand age group teams. Williamson's grandmother Joan Williamson-Orr served as mayor of Taupō. His first cousin Dane Cleaver has also played international cricket for New Zealand.

Williamson played senior representative cricket at the age of 14 and first-class cricket at 16. He attended Tauranga Boys' College from 2004 to 2008, where he was head boy in his final year. He was coached by Pacey Depina who  described Williamson as having "a thirst to be phenomenal – but not at anyone else's expense." He reportedly scored 40 centuries before he left school.

Domestic career

Northern Districts 
Williamson made his debut for Northern Districts in 2007 at the age of 17, who he has remained with for the duration of his New Zealand domestic career.
He scored his first T20 hundred, on 19 September 2014, making 101* in 49 balls to guide Northern Districts to a comfortable win against Cape Cobras in Champions League Twenty20 2014.

English county cricket 
Williamson signed for Gloucestershire to play in the 2011 English county season. On 14 August 2013, he signed for Yorkshire for the rest of the season and subsequently signed to return for the 2014 season, when his side won the County Championship. He signed to return the latter part of the 2015 season, but when incumbent overseas player Aaron Finch was not selected for the Australia ODI squad, Yorkshire ultimately chose to extend Finch's deal in place of Williamson. He subsequently signed a deal for part of the 2016 season, and also returned for a part of the 2018 season .

Indian Premier League
In February 2015 Williamson signed for Indian Premier League side Sunrisers Hyderabad (SRH). He played for the side in the 2016 season, winning the title, and was retained for the 2017 and 2018 seasons. He captained the side in 2018, replacing David Warner. Under Williamson's captaincy, Sunrisers Hyderabad finished runners-up and he was the season's leading scorer, with 735 runs. In IPL 2021, Kane took over the captaincy from David Warner in the middle of the season. However, SRH finished last in the tournament, winning only 3 matches. He was retained by the franchise for the 2022 edition as the captain, but failed to perform, averaging 19.64, with a strike rate of 93.51 and scoring one half-century. He will play for Gujarat Titans in IPL 2023 after they bid INR 2 crore for him.

International career
Williamson was 17, when he led the New Zealand Under-19 side in the World Cup in Malaysia in 2008. New Zealand reached the semi-final, where they lost to the eventual champions India. On 24 March 2010, Williamson was named in the New Zealand Test squad for the second Test against Australia, but ultimately he did not play in the match.

Williamson made his One-Day International debut against India on 10 August 2010. He was dismissed for a 9th ball duck. In his second match, he was bowled by Angelo Mathews for a second ball duck. He scored his maiden ODI century against Bangladesh on 14 October 2010 in Dhaka and hence became the youngest centurion in New Zealand's cricket history. Due to his performance on the Bangladesh tour where New Zealand suffered a 4–0 whitewash, Williamson was selected in the New Zealand Test squad for the tour of India that followed.

Williamson made his Test cricket debut against India at Ahmedabad on 4 November 2010. In his first innings he scored 131 runs off 299 balls and became the eighth New Zealand player to score a century on Test debut.

Rising through the ranks 
Williamson scored  161 not out against West Indies in June 2014, his second century of the series and helped secure a rare away Test series victory for his side.  He finished as the leading overall run scorer in the series with 413 runs, and was denied a double century only by rain, which encouraged skipper Brendon McCullum to declare in the interest of obtaining a result in the match. He was also reported for a suspect bowling action in April 2014, but was cleared in December 2014. His illegal bowling action started after he left high school in order to get a faster release and turn on the ball. His new action essentially reverts him to his action in high school, with a more side-on approach and less wrist and elbow deviation. He was also named as captain ahead of the ODI and Twenty20 series against Pakistan as Brendon McCullum was rested.

Williamson scored 100* off 69 balls against Zimbabwe at Bulawayo, which at the time was the second fastest century by a New Zealander in a One-Day International. He also established one of the most potent top-order partnership with Ross Taylor, with Williamson himself being the most prolific number-three batsman for the national side since former captain Stephen Fleming. As a fielder, his position is predominantly at gully.

In 2015, he started with 69 and 242* against Sri Lanka, with two catches in the field in a man-of-the-match performance.  On 3 February 2015, he scored the 99th ODI century in the New Zealand's history, against Pakistan; Ross Taylor scored the 100th in the same match. He also scored over 700 runs before the 2015 Cricket World Cup in the first two months of the calendar year. On 17 June 2015 he became the fifth-fastest batsmen and fastest New Zealander to score 3,000 runs, getting them in just 78 innings. On 15 November 2015 Williamson and Taylor became the first pair of away batsmen to each score 2nd innings centuries at WACA Ground in Perth.

In December 2015, during the second Test against Sri Lanka, Williamson broke the record for the most Test runs scored in a calendar year by a New Zealander, with 1172 runs. He also ended 2015 with 2692 runs, the highest total across all forms of international cricket for the year, and third highest total in a single year.

He was awarded the T20 Player of the Year by NZC for the 2014–15 season.

Captaincy 
In March 2016, Williamson assumed the position of captain of New Zealand across all forms of cricket after the retirement of Brendon McCullum, beginning with the World T20I cup in India. He was named as captain of the 'Team of the Tournament' by Cricinfo and Cricbuzz. He also picked up NZ player of the year, Test player of the year and the Redpath Cup for top batsman in first class cricket for the second year in a row.

In August 2016, during the Test series against Zimbabwe, Williamson became the thirteenth batsman to score a century against all the other Test playing nations. He completed this in the fewest innings, the quickest time from his Test debut and became the youngest player to achieve this feat.

Williamson set a new record for scoring the most centuries by a New Zealand batsman in Tests, with his 18th, in March 2018 when he score 102 against England at Auckland. Later that year, he scored his 10,000th run in first-class cricket, batting for the English side Yorkshire in the 2018 County Championship. On 8 December 2018, he scored his 19th Test century in the deciding 3rd game in the Pakistan away series. On 7 December 2018, Williamson became the first player from New Zealand to cross 900 rating points in the ICC Test batting rankings.  During the 2019 Test series against Bangladesh, Williamson scored 200 not out as New Zealand posted a team total of 715, their highest ever in a Test innings. He also became the fastest New Zealand player to score 6,000 runs in Test cricket.

In April 2019, he was named the captain of New Zealand's squad for the 2019 Cricket World Cup. During the tournament, he scored an unbeaten 106 to guide New Zealand to victory over South Africa, scoring his 3,000th run as captain of New Zealand in ODIs in the process. On 22 June, Williamson scored 148 runs off 154 balls in a 5-run victory over West Indies, his career best score in ODI cricket. One week later, in the match against Australia, Williamson became the third-fastest batsman, in terms of innings, to score 6,000 runs in ODIs, doing so in his 139th innings. At the end of the World Cup, he was awarded the Player of the Tournament award after becoming the highest scoring captain in a single World Cup, making 578 runs in 10 matches. He was named as captain of the 'Team of the Tournament' by the ICC and ESPNCricinfo.

In November 2020, Williamson was nominated for the Sir Garfield Sobers Award for ICC Male Cricketer of the Decade, and the award for Test cricketer of the decade. On 4 December, Williamson scored 251 runs, his highest test score, in the first innings of the first Test against West Indies and helped New Zealand win the match by an innings and 134 runs.

In June 2021, he led New Zealand to victory in the inaugural ICC World Test Championship, beating India in the final by eight wickets. In August 2021, Williamson was named as the captain of New Zealand's squad for the 2021 ICC Men's T20 World Cup. Under his captaincy, New Zealand reached their third consecutive ICC event final across all formats after beating England in the semi-final of the T20 World Cup. In the final, Williamson scored a brilliant knock of 85 off 48 balls but ended up on the losing side after facing defeat to Australia by 8 wickets. He was New Zealand's top scorer in the tournament with 216 runs at an average of 43.20.

(2022–present) 
In December 2022, Williamson stepped down as New Zealand's Test captain, ahead of their tour to Pakistan. In the first Test, he scored his fifth double century in Tests, and became the first New Zealand batter to hit five double centuries in Test cricket. He also became the first New Zealand batter to achieve the milestone of 25 century in Test cricket. 

On 28 February 2023, Williamson surpassed Ross Taylor's tally of 7,683 runs to become New Zealand's highest run scorer in Test cricket, on the same day he also scored his 26th Test century against England in the second Test of the two match Test series. 

On 18 March 2023, Williamson scored his 29th century in test cricket. He went on to turn the innings into his 6th test match double century.

International centuries

, Williamson has scored 28 Test and 13 ODI centuries. His highest score in Test is 251 and 148 in ODIs. He is yet to score a century in T20Is.

Achievements
In the annual ICC Awards in January 2022, Williamson was included in ICC Men's Test Team of the Year for the year 2021.

Personal life
He bowls and bats right handed but writes left handed. Williamson has two children, a daughter and son with wife Sarah Raheem whom he met in 2015.  During the New Zealand vs Pakistan 2014 ODI series, Williamson donated his entire match fee for all five ODIs to the victims of the 2014 Peshawar school massacre.

References

External links

 
Kane Williamson at Howstat

|-

|-

1990 births
Living people
Cricketers who made a century on Test debut
Cricketers at the 2011 Cricket World Cup
Cricketers at the 2015 Cricket World Cup
Cricketers at the 2019 Cricket World Cup
Gloucestershire cricketers
Gujarat Titans cricketers
New Zealand cricketers
New Zealand One Day International cricketers
New Zealand Test cricket captains
New Zealand Test cricketers
New Zealand Twenty20 International cricketers
Northern Districts cricketers
Sportspeople from Tauranga
Sunrisers Hyderabad cricketers
Wisden Leading Cricketers in the World
Wisden Cricketers of the Century
Yorkshire cricketers